Lami (autonym:  in Honghe County, meaning 'low status') is a Southern Loloish language of Yunnan, China. Lami is spoken in Jiangcheng Hani and Yi Autonomous County, Mojiang Hani Autonomous County, Jinping Miao, Yao, and Dai Autonomous County, and Honghe County. Lami is also spoken in Hade 哈德, Sanmeng Township 三猛乡, Lüchun County.

The Lami language has been documented by Zhang (1998) and Wang (2011).

Distribution
In Mojiang County, Lami is spoken by a total of 3,105 people in the following townships (Yang & Zhang 2010:9).

Naha Township 那哈乡 (1,844 persons)
Longtan Township 龙潭乡 (446 persons)
Yutang Township 渔塘乡 (415 persons)
Baliu Township 坝溜乡 (312 persons)
Tongguan Town 联珠镇 (88 persons)

Lefèvre-Pontalis (1892) reports the presence of Lami in Xieng-Hung (Jinghong), and provides a word list for Lami as well.

References

Wang Li 王力. 2011. 国际哈尼/阿卡区域文化调查: 中国绿春县哈德哈尼族腊米人文化实录. Kunming: Yunnan People's Press 云南人民出版社. 
Yang Hong [杨洪], Zhang Hong [张红]. 2010. Demographics and current situations of Hani subgroups in Mojiang County [墨江哈尼族自治县哈尼支系与人口现状调查研究]. Journal of Honghe University [红河学院学报]. Vol. 8, No. 3. Jun. 2010. DOI:10.13963/j.cnki.hhuxb.2010.03.028
You Weiqiong [尤伟琼]. 2013. Classifying ethnic groups of Yunnan [云南民族识别研究]. Beijing: Nationalities Press [民族出版社].
Zhang Peizhi [张佩芝]. 1998. Comparative vocabulary lists of the Ha-Ya dialects of the Hani language [哈尼语哈雅方言土语词汇对照]. Kunming: Yunnan Ethnic Publishing House [云南民族出版社].

Southern Loloish languages
Languages of Yunnan